Bridget Durity (born 8 October 1951) is a Trinidadian cricketer. He played in six first-class matches for Trinidad and Tobago in 1973/74 and 1974/75.

See also
 List of Trinidadian representative cricketers

References

External links
 

1951 births
Living people
Trinidad and Tobago cricketers